Mr. X in Bombay, directed by Pradyuman Bhardwaj, is a 1964 Indian science fiction romantic comedy film starring Kishore Kumar, Kumkum and Madan Puri.

Plot 

Shobha lives a wealthy lifestyle with her scientist dad Prof. Mathur, who is now carrying out experiments on various issues. One day while doing so, he makes an employee named Manohar drink a potion, which results in his death. Rajan comes to their rescue, gets rid of the body, and starts blackmailing Mathur, which can only end when Shobha marries Rajan. Then one day she meets a poet by the name of Sudarshan and both of them fall in love. When he asks for her hand in marriage, she refuses. 

The next day Shobha finds a note addressed to her from Sudarshan in which he has stated that he is going to kill himself. Thereafter, every night she starts to hear Sudarshan's voice, blaming her for his death, as his soul is unable to find solace. With Sudarshan out of the way, Rajan readies himself for marrying Shobha - and it looks like he may have his way with the Mathur after all - without having to encounter any more obstacles. But all this time, Dixit was actually invisible and not dead. With the help of Shobha's father, he gets visible again. They get married and live happily ever after.

Cast 
 Kishore Kumar as Kavi Sudarshan
 Kumkum as Shobha Mathur
 Madan Puri as Rajan
 Randhir as Professor Mathur
 Mohan Choti as Tribhang Das
 Leela Mishra as Sudarshan's mother
 Jeevan Kala as Neena
 Kesari as Reena
 Polson
 Tuntun

Soundtrack 
The music for this film was composed by Laxmikant–Pyarelal and lyrics were penned by Anand Bakshi and Asad Bhopali.

The song "Mere Mehboob Qayamat Hogi" sung by Kishore Kumar became an evergreen hit.

Trivia
 In the scene when Kishore Kumar drinks what he thinks is a poison, he says 'Khush raho ahede vatan, hum to safar karte hain'... These lines were taken in the song 'Raah pe chalte hain' credited to Gulzar in the 1982 movie Namkeen for which Pancham da gave music.

 The song 'Khubsoorat haseena' inspired the tune of 'Ae mere humsafar' composed by Anu Malik in the 1993 movie Baazigar.

 In another scene, Kishore Kumar is heard humming 'Maine laakhon ko bol sahe', these are lyrics from the same song from 1947 film Leela. The song, a thumri, was also sung later by Nirmala Devi and Ghulam Ali for another album in 1979.

References

External links 

1960s Hindi-language films
1964 films
Films scored by Laxmikant–Pyarelal
Films set in Mumbai
Indian science fiction thriller films
Indian science fiction films